Kenneth Taylor Foggo (born 7 November 1943, in Perth, Scotland) is a former football player.

He started his football career with West Bromwich Albion, but is best remembered for his time with Norwich City, for which he played from 1967 to 1972. While playing for Norwich as a winger, he won the Player of the Year award twice and was the team's top scorer in three successive years. He was a member of the Norwich team that won the second division championship in 1972 and promotion to the top division for the first time in the club's history.

After leaving Norwich in 1972 he played for Portsmouth and Southend United.

Honours
 Second Division Championship 1971–72
 Norwich City player of the year 1969, 1971

References

Canary Citizens by Mike Davage, John Eastwood, Kevin Platt, published by Jarrold Publishing, (2001), Ken Foggo himself,

1943 births
Living people
Scottish footballers
West Bromwich Albion F.C. players
Norwich City F.C. players
Portsmouth F.C. players
Southend United F.C. players
Footballers from Perth, Scotland
Association football wingers
Chelmsford City F.C. players